The 1695 Siege of Namur or Second Siege of Namur took place during the Nine Years' War between 2 July and 4 September 1695. Its capture by the French in the 1692 and recapture by the Grand Alliance in 1695 are often viewed as the defining events of the war; the second siege is considered to be William III's most significant military success during the war.

Background 

Namur was divided into the 'City,' with the residential and commercial areas, and the Citadel that controlled access to the rivers Sambre and Meuse. In 1692, the Dutch military engineer Menno van Coehoorn made the Citadel one of the strongest defensive points in Flanders, but the garrison was less than 5,000, many of them poorly-trained Spanish troops with low morale. While the outer City fell relatively quickly, capturing the Citadel took the French over a month and they were nearly forced to withdraw by torrential rain and sickness. This was partly due to the terms negotiated for surrendering the City; van Coehoorn agreed not to fire on the City from the Citadel, in return for the French agreeing not to attack him from that direction, making it almost impregnable. After its capture, Namur's defences were significantly upgraded by Vauban.

After 1693, Louis XIV assumed a largely defensive posture in Flanders. French victories at Steinkirk and Landen and the capture of Namur, Mons, Huy and Charleroi failed to force the Dutch Republic out of the war. The cost had exhausted the French economy with crop failures in 1693 and 1694 causing widespread famine in France and Northern Italy.

The Dutch Republic remained intact and the Alliance held together under William through four years of war. Their losses were damaging but not critical; in 1694, they had recaptured towns like Huy and Diksmuide, and by 1695 held a numerical advantage for the first time.

However, the Allies had also reached the limit of their resources. The 1690s marked the lowest point of the so-called Little Ice Age, a period of cold and wet weather affecting Europe in the second half of the 17th century. Spain and Scotland in particular experienced famine; the harvest failed in 1695, 1696, 1698 and 1699 and an estimated 5-15% of the population starved to death. 

While this theatre is commonly referred to as Flanders, most campaigning took place in the Spanish Netherlands, a compact area 160 kilometres wide, the highest point only 100 metres above sea level, and dominated by canals and rivers. In the 17th century, goods and supplies were largely transported by water and the war was fought for control of rivers such as the Lys, Sambre and Meuse.

Retaking Namur became the key objective for 1695 as its location between the Sambre and Meuse made it a vital part of the "Barrier" system. This was a chain of fortresses in the Spanish Netherlands the Dutch viewed as essential for defence against French invasion and possession would be extremely advantageous in any peace negotiations.

The French commander in Flanders, Marshal Luxembourg, died in January 1695 and was replaced by the less talented Villeroi. French strategy for 1695 was to remain on the defensive and Boufflers spent April constructing entrenchments between the rivers Scheldt and Lys, from Coutrai/Kortrijk to Avelgem. William marched on these in June with the bulk of the Allied force but secretly detached Frederick of Prussia to Namur. Once Frederick was in place on 2 July, William joined him; the Allies were now split into a besieging force of 58,000 at Namur and a field army of 102,000 under Prince Vaudémont to cover Villeroi.

Siege 

On 2 July the Earl of Athlone unexpectedly surrounded Namur with the cavalry. Although this was a surprise to the French, Boufflers had a garrison of 13,000-16,000 men, making a siege a formidable challenge. After Athlone's action, the circumvallation line was soon completed. After the artillery equipment arrived, on 12 June, the Brandenburgs, from across the Meuse River, opened the artillery fire on the City; the next day, the Dutch started it on the St Nicolas Gate side, with Major General Fagel being wounded in the neck by a musket ball. While on July 18 the French launched an assault on the position of Brandenburg's General-Field Marshal Heino Heinrich Graf von Flemming, the Dutch under Major General Ernst Wilhelm von Salisch captured three detached bastions and forts outside the St Nicholas Gate and, with sword in hand, drove the French into the city itself. The losses on both sides were heavy.

On 27 June, William III personally led a successful attack of 400 Dutch and English grenadiers on the counterscarp. At the same time, the Maximilian of Bavaria took possession of an abbey, from which he forced over 300 dragoons into the Citadel. After the capture of the line Vauban had built between the Meuse and Sambre rivers in the rocks, and further Allied successes, the French decided to surrender the city. After 4 August only the Citadel was still in French hands. Half the French garrison had been lost. Count Guiscard, the Governor of Namur, asked for a truce to allow the French to withdraw to the Citadel, which was accepted and the siege resumed after six days. However, a siege of the Citadel could not be proceeded with immediately due to a lack of money to pay the workers.

Vaudémont's role was to keep his field army between Villeroi and Namur, while Villeroi tried to tempt him out of position by attacking Allied-held towns like Knokke and Beselare, now Zonnebeke. Vaudémont refused to be drawn since both sides knew the longer the siege went on, the more likely Namur was to fall. Villeroi's attempts to out-manoeuvre Vaudémont were unsuccessful, despite the capture of Diksmuide and Deinze in late July with 6,000 - 7,000 prisoners. The Bombardment of Brussels between 13–15 August also failed to divert the Allies, despite destroying large parts of the commercial centre; Constantijn Huygens, William's Secretary for Dutch affairs, visited Brussels on 11 September and recorded that the 'ruin caused...was horrible...and in many places, the houses reduced to rubble.'

By mid-August, the Citadel was largely intact, Villeroi was making resupply much more difficult, while the besiegers were beginning to lose men to disease, in an age when far more soldiers died from illness than in battle. The Allies were running out of time and Coehoorn and William now agreed a new approach; a battery of 200 guns was established in Namur city and on 21 August began a continuous 24-hour bombardment of the Citadel's lower defences. Boufflers later told Louis it was 'the most prodigious artillery ever assembled' and by 26 August the Allies were ready to assault the Citadel. At midnight on 27th, Villeroi finally made contact with Vaudémont but his numerical advantage of 120,000 to 102,000 was offset by their strongly entrenched positions. Having failed to outflank the Allied lines, Villeroi retreated and William gave the order for a general assault.

The assaults by the Allies were extremely bloody, that of 30 August alone costing 3,000 men in less than three hours but the defenders were eventually forced back to their final lines of defence. Count Guiscard, now commanding the key outwork of Fort Orange, told Boufflers on 2 September they could not repulse another attack and the garrison surrendered on 4 September, having suffered 8,000 casualties to the Allies 18,000.

Aftermath 

The recapture of Namur was a major achievement for the Allies but Bouffler's energetic defence prevented them taking advantage of French weakness elsewhere, an achievement recognised by Louis promoting him to Field-Marshall. Neither side was capable of mounting an offensive in 1696 and serious fighting came to an end, although Louis made one final demonstration prior to the signing of the Treaty of Ryswick in September 1697.
 
Namur showcased Coehoorn's offensive tactics and also the defensive precepts set out in his 1685 work New Fortress Construction or Nieuwe Vestingbouw op een natte of lage horisont. These can be summarised as follows; (1) passive reliance on fortifications was not enough and (b) in trying to hold an entire town, defenders simply risked losing it very quickly. This meant dividing fortifications into inner (Citadel) and outer (City) and conducting an 'active' defence that used constant counter attacks to keep the besiegers off guard. Bouffler applied these concepts but jeopardised his defence by committing too many troops to the outer City without means of retreat.

He would apply these lessons at the Siege of Lille in 1708. Historian John Lynn summarised his defence of Namur as follows; (He) demonstrated one could effectively win a campaign by losing a fortress, provided you pinned down and exhausted the besieging force in the process. He conducted a classic active defence, launching attacks by the garrison on the enemy's siege works, contesting every advance as best he could.

Prisoners were normally exchanged as soon as possible, partly because neither side wanted the expense of having to feed them. On this occasions, the French refused William's request for the return of the 6,000 - 7,000 troops captured at Diksmuide and Deinze due to a dispute over the terms of their surrender. By now, shortage of manpower was a problem for all combatants; many of the rank and file were forcibly enlisted into French regiments and sent to fight in Italy or Spain. Desertion from one army to another to receive a signing-on bonus was common, particularly as these were paid immediately and wages were often months in arrears. As recruiters were paid for each man they enlisted, several thousand additional soldiers represented significant profits for the French officers involved. In retaliation, despite the garrison of Namur being allowed to surrender on terms, Boufflers was taken prisoner and released only when the remaining Allied prisoners had been returned in September.

Legacy

While the Bombardment of Brussels failed to distract the Allies, some see it as marking the end of a period where the dominant form of warfare was taking or holding fortifications. By demonstrating fortified towns could no longer resist the massive firepower available in modern warfare, it led to a move away from siege warfare and into the direct confrontations advocated by Marlborough and others in the War of the Spanish Succession.

The two sieges of Namur caused a major media spectacle. There are few examples in early modern history where the media commented so extensively, so diversely and so multi-medially on military events. In Dutch Republic, France and England an incredible amount of eulogies, illustrations, maps and medals related to the sieges were produced, and newspapers wrote about the events in great detail. Although much of this was done on the publicists' own initiative, it was also encouraged by the state. This way, the governments hoped that the public remained engaged and convinced of the war effort and that it would make their allies more confident, while reducing the enemy's morale. Both William and Louis also saw all the publicity as an opportunity to enhance their reputation.

The assault by 3,000 British troops on the Terra Nova earthwork on 31 August spearheaded by 700 grenadiers is alleged to have been the inspiration for the song "The British Grenadiers".

The siege and its aftermath is the centre of the novel Mother Ross; an Irish Amazon by GR Lloyd. This is an update of Daniel Defoe's original that purports to be the story of Christian "Kit" Cavanagh, alias Christian Davies, an Irish woman who enlisted in the British Army in 1693 disguised as a man and was present at the siege. Defoe claims to have met her in old age when she was a Chelsea Pensioner; it contains a number of factual errors but is an interesting and rare observation of the siege from the rank and file.

Laurence Sterne's 1760 novel Tristram Shandy refers to a number of events from the Nine Years' War, including Namur where Tristram's uncle Toby suffered an unspecified "groin injury". He and his trusted servant Corporal Trim build a replica of the battle in his garden which he shows to his fiancée Widow Wadman among others. The Widow tries to determine how serious Toby's injury is before committing to marriage but he avoids her questions by providing increasingly elaborate accounts of the siege. This episode and Toby's reconstruction appear in the 2006 film A Cock and Bull Story.

Fourteen British regiments earned a battle honour for "Namur 1695" including the Grenadier, Coldstream and Scots Guards, the Royal Scots, the King's Own Scottish Borderers, the Royal Irish Regiment, the Royal Welch Fusiliers, the Royal Warwickshire Fusiliers, the Queen's Royal Regiment (West Surrey), the East Yorkshire Regiment and the West Yorkshire Regiment, the King's Own Royal Regiment and the King's Own Royal Border Regiment.

Notes

References

Sources
 
 
 
 
 
 Lenihan, Padraig; Namur Citadel, 1695: A Case Study in Allied Siege Tactics (War in History, 2011)
 
 
 
 
 
 
 

Conflicts in 1695
Battles of the Nine Years' War
Sieges involving France
Sieges involving the Holy Roman Empire
Sieges involving England
Sieges involving Scotland
Sieges involving Ireland
Sieges involving the Dutch Republic
Battles involving the Spanish Netherlands
1695 in the Habsburg Netherlands
1695 in France
1695 in England
1695 in Scotland
1695 in the Dutch Republic
Siege of Namur (1695)